was a Japanese diver. She competed at the 1936 Summer Olympics in the 10 m platform event and finished in fourth place.

References

 

1915 births
2010 deaths
Japanese female divers
Olympic divers of Japan
Divers at the 1936 Summer Olympics
20th-century Japanese women